Grog the God-Slayer is a fictional character appearing in American comic books published by Marvel Comics. The character is depicted as a member of the Heliopolitan race of gods.

Publication history
Grog first appeared in Thor #390 (April 1988), and was created by Tom DeFalco and Ron Frenz.

The character subsequently appears in Thor #396-400 (Oct. 1988-Feb. 1989). His final appearance was in Thor vol. 3 Annual #1 (1990).

Grog the God-Slayer received an entry in the Official Handbook of the Marvel Universe Update '89 #3.

Fictional character biography
A loyal follower of the Egyptian God of death, Seth, Grog led his armies to assassinate the Asgardian God of Thunder, Thor after his return to Earth. On the Avengers' floating headquarters called Hydro-Base, Grog, and a horde of soldiers, made their first strike. Thor was aided by his comrades, the Captain and the Black Knight, and the three of them managed to defeat Grog and all of Seth's men. Grog was carted off to the Vault by the Black Knight, but he would soon be free again.

After a second attempt, by Seth, to take the life of Thor by creating a group of super humans called Earth Force, Thor went to the Vault to question Grog of his master's whereabouts.
Not alone, Thor traveled with fellow Asgardian Hogun, the Grim, the Black Knight, and the reformed Earth Force, but Grog was not intimidated by the forces that massed against him. Once freed from his shackles, Grog summoned a portal back to the territory of Seth and escaped his foes. Thor had planned on Grog's escape in order to follow him into the realm of death so he could face the Death god, but Grog had been ready for Thor and his allies by having a welcoming party ready to greet his enemies once they were through the portal. The heroes fought valiantly, but were ultimately overwhelmed by Seth's troops. Thor, too, fell before his enemies when Balder, the Brave, summoned Thor's powers back to Asgard to help defend the Golden City against another wave of Seth's unrelenting attack. Grog reveled in his triumph over the Thunder god.

The victory was short-lived, however, because with the seeming death of Balder came the return of Thor's powers. Thor wasted no time in dispatching his foe and damaging the stronghold of Seth, the Black Pyramid. Grog, now bound and at the mercy of his captors, knew the fortress better than his enemies and got away using a secret door in the pyramid's corridors. However, he soon returned with reinforcements to crush Thor once and for all. His strategy did not go as planned for the combined might of the Asgardians, Earth Force, the Black Knight, and the other Egyptian gods proved to be too much for Grog and his men. Unwilling to admit defeat, Grog resurfaced for the final time as Surtur, the fire demon, battled Thor. He shouted boasts of his recovery and his opponents’ inevitable defeat, but it was he who met his demise when Surtur used the remains of the Black Pyramid as a weapon against the mighty Thor. Throwing the citadel at Thor, the Black Pyramid was destroyed by Thor's mallet, Mjolnir, leaving Grog and his remaining forces to be crushed inside.

Grog was later sent to Earth by Seth with Gog, Magog and Scarab to hunt down an emotionally battered Thor, who just killed his grandfather Borr. The villains were supposed to report the location of Thor, but Grog thought he could take advantage of the weakened Thor. Thor was able to defeat Grog and as punishment Seth severed Grog's hand.

References

External links
 Grog at the Marvel Comics wiki

Characters created by Ron Frenz
Characters created by Tom DeFalco
Comics characters introduced in 1988
Marvel Comics deities
Marvel Comics supervillains
Mythology in Marvel Comics